Visakhapatnam East Assembly constituency is a constituency in Visakhapatnam district of Andhra Pradesh, representing the state legislative assembly in India. It is one of the seven assembly segments of Visakhapatnam (Lok Sabha constituency), along with Bheemili, Visakhapatnam South, Visakhapatnam North, Visakhapatnam West and Gajuwaka. Ramakrishna Babu Velagapudi is the present MLA of the constituency, who won the 2019 Andhra Pradesh Legislative Assembly election from Telugu Desam Party. , there are a total of 271,215 electors in the constituency.

Mandals 
The mandal and wards that form the assembly constituency are:

Members of Legislative Assembly Visakhapatnam East

Election results

Assembly Elections 2009

Assembly elections 2014

Assembly elections 2019

See also 
 List of constituencies of the Andhra Pradesh Legislative Assembly

References 

Assembly constituencies of Andhra Pradesh